

Plants

Ferns and fern allies

Conifers

Flowering plants

Arthropods

Crustaceans

Insects

Archosauromorphs
 Barosaurus gastroliths documented.

Newly named dinosaurs
Data courtesy of George Olshevsky's dinosaur genera list.

Synapsids

Non-mammalian

References

 Janensch, W. (1929). Magensteine bei Sauropoden der Tendaguru-Schichten. Palaeontographica (Suppl. 7) 2:135-144.
 Sanders F, Manley K, Carpenter K. Gastroliths from the Lower Cretaceous sauropod Cedarosaurus weiskopfae. In: Tanke D.H, Carpenter K, editors. Mesozoic vertebrate life: new research inspired by the paleontology of Philip J. Currie. Indiana University Press; Bloomington, IN: 2001. pp. 166–180.

1920s in paleontology
Paleontology
Paleontology 9